In mathematics, a series expansion is a technique that expresses a function as an infinite sum, or series, of simpler functions. It is a method for calculating a function that cannot be expressed by just elementary operators (addition, subtraction, multiplication and division).

The resulting so-called series often can be limited to a finite number of terms, thus yielding an approximation of the function. The  fewer terms of the sequence are used, the simpler this approximation will be. Often, the resulting inaccuracy (i.e., the partial sum of the omitted terms) can be described by an equation involving Big O notation (see also asymptotic expansion). The series expansion on an open interval will also be an approximation for non-analytic functions.

Types of series expansions 
There are several kinds of series expansions, listed below.

A Taylor series is a power series based on a function's derivatives at a single point. More specifically, if a function  is infinitely differentiable around a point , then the Taylor series of f around this point is given by  under the convention . A Laurent series is a generalization of the Taylor series, allowing negative exponent values; it takes the form  and converges in an annulus.

A general Dirichlet series is a series of the form  One important special case of this is the ordinary Dirichlet series  Used in number theory.

A Fourier series is an expansion of periodic functions as a sum of many sine and cosine functions. More specifically, the Fourier series of a function  of period  is given by the expression  where the coefficients are given by the formulae
 In acoustics, e.g., the fundamental tone and the overtones together form an example of a Fourier series.

Newtonian series

Legendre polynomials: Used in physics to describe an arbitrary electrical field as a superposition of a dipole field, a quadrupole field, an octupole field, etc.

Zernike polynomials: Used in optics to calculate aberrations of optical systems. Each term in the series describes a particular type of aberration.

The Stirling series  is an approximation of the log-gamma function.

Examples
The following is the Taylor series of :

The Dirichlet series of the Riemann zeta function is

References 

 
Algebra
Polynomials
Mathematical analysis
Mathematical series